The Royal Maas Yacht Club is a Dutch yacht club and rowing club located in the centre of Rotterdam.

Members are able to engage in sailing and rowing and the yacht club's name, de Maas, stems from the name of the river Nieuwe Maas flowing through Rotterdam.

The yacht club, founded in 1851, belongs to the oldest yacht clubs in the Netherlands. It has around 2500 members. The predicate 'Royal' was bestowed in 1901; in 1931 women were allowed to become a member. 'Maas' members have, by royal decree, the privilege to fly an embellished Netherlands ensign, showing a St George cross and golden King's crown (see picture).

The clubhouse designed by the architects Barend Hooijkaas jr. en Michiel Brinkman, was opened in April 1909. This elegant Jugendstil creation, which just survived the bombardment of the centre of Rotterdam in May 1940, is an important example of modern architectural art in the Netherlands.

The club's patron is Queen Beatrix; her son the Prince of Orange and the mayor of Rotterdam are Maas members. The renowned Dutch sailor Conny van Rietschoten, who won the Whitbread race twice, was an honorary Maas member.

See also
Algemene Rotterdamse Studenten Roeivereniging "Skadi"

External links
Royal Maas Yacht Club official site

Royal yacht clubs
Maas
Organisations based in the Netherlands with royal patronage
Rowing clubs in the Netherlands
Organisations based in Rotterdam
1851 establishments in the Netherlands
Art Nouveau architecture in the Netherlands
Buildings and structures completed in 1909
Buildings and structures in Rotterdam
19th-century architecture in the Netherlands